Lara Escauriza (born 14 October 1998) is a Paraguayan tennis player.

Escauriza has a career-high singles ranking by the Women's Tennis Association (WTA) of 778, achieved on 9 March 2020. She also has a career-high doubles ranking of 513, reached on 16 April 2018. Escauriza has won three doubles titles on the ITF Circuit.

Escauriza also has represented Paraguay in the Fed Cup.

She is the daughter of Olympian Claudio Escauriza.

ITF Circuit finals

Singles: 2 (1 title, 1 runner–up)

Doubles: 7 (3 titles, 4 runner–ups)

References

External links
 
 
 

1998 births
Living people
Paraguayan female tennis players
Sportspeople from Asunción
21st-century Paraguayan women